S16 may refer to:

Automobiles 
 Chery QQme, a Chinese city car
 Peugeot 306 S16, a French family car
 Proton S16, a Malaysian subcompact car

Aviation 
 Copalis State Airport, in Grays Harbor County, Washington, United States
 Letov Š-16, a Czechoslovak biplane bomber
 Rans S-16 Shekari, an American acrobatic monoplane
 SIAI S.16, an Italian flying boat
 Sikorsky S-16 a Russian biplane fighter
 SPAD S.XVI, a French biplane bomber

Rail and transit 
 S16 (ZVV), a rail line of the Zürich S-Bahn
 Haruka Station, in Ōzu, Ehime Prefecture, Japan
 Higashi-ojima Station, in Kōtō, Tokyo, Japan
 Namba Station, in Chūō-ku, Osaka, Japan
 Seishin-minami Station, in Nishi-ku, Kobe, Japan
 Shioya Station (Hokkaido), in Otaru, Hokkaido, Japan
 Tsurusato Station, in Minami-ku, Nagoya, Aichi, Japan

Roads 
 Arlberg Schnellstraße, Austria
 Expressway S16 (Poland)
 County Route S16 (California), United States

Vessels 
 
 , a submarine of the Royal Navy
 , a torpedo boat of the Imperial German Navy
 , a submarine of the United States Navy

Other uses 
 S16 (album), by French musician Woodkid
 40S ribosomal protein S16
 British NVC community S16, a swamps and tall-herb fens community in the British National Vegetation Classification system
 S16: Keep away from sources of ignition - No smoking, a safety phrase
 S16 ribosomal protein leader